Fanatic (released as Die! Die! My Darling! in the United States) is a 1965 British horror thriller film directed by Silvio Narizzano for Hammer Films. It stars Tallulah Bankhead, Stefanie Powers, Peter Vaughan, Yootha Joyce, Maurice Kaufmann and Donald Sutherland.

Released in theaters on 21 March 1965 in United Kingdom, it was filmed at Elstree Studios and on location in Letchmore Heath, Hertfordshire, during the summer of 1964. It was Bankhead's final feature film.

Plot
An American woman, Patricia Carroll (Powers), arrives in London to marry her lover Alan Glentower (Kaufmann). Before tying the knot, however, Patricia pays a visit to Mrs. Trefoile (Bankhead), the mother of her deceased fiancé Stephen, who died in an automobile accident several years earlier. Trefoile resides in a secluded house on the edge of an English village. She is fanatically religious, and it soon becomes apparent that she blames Patricia for her son's death. Indeed, when Patricia reveals to her that she never actually intended to marry Stephen, Trefoile enlists the aid of her servants, Harry (Vaughan) and Anna (Joyce), in holding Patricia captive so she can exorcise the young woman's soul. After several attempts to escape the Trefoile house, one of which nearly results in Patricia's being sexually assaulted by Harry, she is rescued by Alan; and in the end, Mrs. Trefoile winds up dead with a knife in her back, the same knife with which she earlier attempted to murder Patricia.

Cast

Critical reception
Variety wrote that the film "should click with fright fans," praising Narizzano's direction as "imaginative" and the script as having dialogue that was generally "fresher than most pix of its class" while giving Bankhead "numerous chances to display virtuosity, from sweet-tongued menace to maniacal blood-lust." The Monthly Film Bulletin declared: "Though uneven in tone (to put it mildly), this piece of extravagance is at least consistently enjoyable ... One suspects here a laudable determination in Miss Bankhead not to be outdone by Bette Davis' Baby Jane. Still, why cavil? There is enough here to give horror addicts a field day on various levels." A. H. Weiler of The New York Times wrote that although Bankhead "towers above the cast and story, her present effort adds little to her record."
  
The film maintains a 44% rating on review aggregation website Rotten Tomatoes based on 9 reviews.

See also
 Looped, a 2010 Broadway play that uses the production of this film as its setting
 Psycho-biddy genre

References

External links

 

1965 films
1965 horror films
1960s horror thriller films
British horror thriller films
Films shot at Associated British Studios
Films based on American novels
Hammer Film Productions horror films
Films directed by Silvio Narizzano
Films with screenplays by Richard Matheson
Psycho-biddy films
1960s English-language films
1960s British films